Catenovulum sediminis is a Gram-negative, strictly aerobic, rod-shaped and motile bacterium from the genus of Catenovulum which has been isolated from sediments from the coast of Weihai in China.

References

External links
Type strain of Catenovulum sediminis at BacDive -  the Bacterial Diversity Metadatabase

Alteromonadales
Bacteria described in 2017